Radcliffe Black Lane was a railway station in Radcliffe, Greater Manchester on the now closed Liverpool and Bury Railway between Bury and Bolton.

History
The station opened on 20 November 1848, originally being named Black Lane. On 1 July 1933 it was renamed Radcliffe Black Lane, and it closed on 5 October 1970.

References

External links
Radcliffe Black Lane Station on navigable 1948 O.S. map

Disused railway stations in the Metropolitan Borough of Bury
Former Lancashire and Yorkshire Railway stations
Railway stations in Great Britain opened in 1848
Railway stations in Great Britain closed in 1970
Radcliffe, Greater Manchester